Midnight Special is the fifth studio album by Uncle Kracker, released on November 20, 2012 under Sugar Hill Records. It his first full-length country album and his first not to involve Kid Rock in any capacity.

As of 2022, Midnight Special is his most recent album.

Track listing

Personnel
 Robert Bailey Jr. - background vocals
 Mark Beckett - drums
 Tom Bukovac - electric guitar
 John Catchings - cello
 Mark Douthit - saxophone
 Dan Dugmore - slide guitar
 Nick Garvin - background vocals
 Vicki Hampton - background vocals
 J. T. Harding - background vocals
 Mike Haynes - trumpet
 Uncle Kracker - lead vocals
 Randy McCormick - Hammond B-3 organ, keyboards, piano, Wurlitzer
 Brent Mason - acoustic guitar, electric guitar, slide guitar
 Gary Prim - accordion, Hammond B-3 organ, keyboards, piano, Wurlitzer
 John Wesley Ryles - background vocals
 Bobby Terry - acoustic guitar, electric guitar
 Michael White - background vocals
 Justin Wilson - background vocals
 Glenn Worf - bass guitar
 Joe Geis - album art

Reception

Critical reception 

Reception of the album has been mostly mixed to positive. Allmusic described the album as "a sunny, laid-back ride, a record made for lazy afternoons of day drinking." Roughstock gave the album 4/5 stars and stated "It'd be easy to dismiss Uncle Kracker's first full-length country album as yet another attempt by a pop/rock has-been trying to cash in on mainstream country music's popularity." They also added that Uncle Kracker's transition to Country felt like "A natural one." In a mixed review, Country Weekly noted Uncle Kracker "seeks to have him ingrained further in the genre, despite no hint of country instrumentation." On a more positive note, they added the album is "like tuning in to 1970s AM radio, full of sunny melodies and smooth grooves."

Chart performance

Album

Singles

References 

Uncle Kracker albums
2012 albums
Sugar Hill Records albums
Albums produced by Keith Stegall
Country albums by American artists